Lilium bolanderi is a rare North American species of plants in the lily family, known by the common name Bolander's lily. It is native to northwestern California (Del Norte, Humboldt, & Siskiyou Counties) and southwestern Oregon (Curry + Josephine Counties).

Lilium bolanderi is a perennial herb growing a waxy, erect stem that approaches a meter in height. It originates from a scaly, elongated bulb up to about 7 centimeters long. The wavy oval leaves are located in several whorls about the stem, each waxy green and up to 7 centimeters in length. The inflorescence bears up to 9 large, nodding lily flowers. The flower is bell-shaped with 6 red tepals up to 5 centimeters long and marked with yellow, purple, or darker reds. It often hybridizes with other lilies, producing a variety of forms, colors and patterns. There are 6 stamens with anthers sometimes nearly a centimeter long and a pistil which may be 4 centimeters in length. The flowers are pollinated by Allen's and rufous hummingbirds, Selasphorus sasin and rufus, respectively.

The lily was named after the California botanist Henry Nicholas Bolander.

References

External links
Jepson Manual Treatment
Calphotos Photo gallery

bolanderi
Flora of California
Flora of Oregon
Plants described in 1885
Taxa named by Sereno Watson
Flora without expected TNC conservation status